Latvia competed at the 2022 World Aquatics Championships in Budapest, Hungary from 17 June to 3 July.

Diving

Latvia entered one diver.

Women

Swimming

Latvia entered four swimmers.

Men

Women

Mixed

References

Nations at the 2022 World Aquatics Championships
Latvia at the World Aquatics Championships
2022 in Latvian sport